George Bacon may refer to:

 George Bacon (physicist) (1917–2011), British nuclear physicist
 George Bacon (CIA officer) (1946–1976), American soldier
 George B. Bacon (1836–1876), American clergyman and author
 George Washington Bacon (1830–1922), American mapmaker and publisher
 George Bacon (cricketer) (born 1992), English cricketer